Phillip Dale Leftwich (born May 19, 1969) is an American former professional baseball player who played three seasons for the California Angels of Major League Baseball (MLB). He also played two seasons in Nippon Professional Baseball (NPB) for the Osaka Kintetsu Buffaloes.

Biography
Leftwich was born in Lynchburg, Virginia and graduated from Brookville High School in Lynchburg. He played college baseball at Radford University, where he was Radford University's first all-conference and all-state pitcher. In 1988 and 1989, he was named All-Big South.

Leftwich was the first person to go into major league baseball from Radford University. In 1995 he was inducted into the Radford University Athletic Hall of Fame as part of its inaugural class.

He was drafted by the California Angels in the 2nd round of the 1990 Major League Baseball draft. Leftwich played his first MLB game on July 29, 1993.

Personal
Leftwich was conceived in Virginia when his biological father, Tom Timmermann, was in town to play a road game against the Richmond Braves. He was placed for adoption to a local couple. He first learned of his adoption at age 23, tracked down his father and established a relationship.

Leftwich's son, Luke, was drafted by the Philadelphia Phillies organization in the seventh round of the 2015 draft, as the 204th overall pick. Luke spent 6 years with the Phillies and 1 year with the Los Angeles Angels.

References

External links

Radford University Hall of Fame

1969 births
Living people
American expatriate baseball players in Canada
American expatriate baseball players in Japan
Baseball players from Virginia
Boise Hawks players
California Angels players
Kintetsu Buffaloes players
Lake Elsinore Storm players
Major League Baseball pitchers
Midland Angels players
Osaka Kintetsu Buffaloes players
Quad Cities Angels players
Radford Highlanders baseball players
Sportspeople from Lynchburg, Virginia
Vancouver Canadians players
American adoptees